Cephalobares globiceps, is a species of spider of the genus Cephalobares. It is found in China and Sri Lanka.

See also
 List of Theridiidae species

References

Theridiidae
Spiders of China
Spiders of the Indian subcontinent
Arthropods of Sri Lanka
Spiders described in 1870
Taxa named by Octavius Pickard-Cambridge